In enzymology, a glycerate kinase is an enzyme that catalyzes the chemical reaction

ATP + (R)-glycerate  ADP + 3-phospho-(R)-glycerate
or
ATP + (R)-glycerate  ADP + 2-phospho-(R)-glycerate

Thus, the two substrates of this enzyme are ATP and (R)-glycerate, whereas its two products are ADP and either 3-phospho-(R)-glycerate or 2-phospho-(R)-glycerate.

This enzyme belongs to the family of transferases, specifically those transferring phosphorus-containing groups (phosphotransferases) with an alcohol group as acceptor.  The systematic name of this enzyme class is ATP:(R)-glycerate 3-phosphotransferase. Other names in common use include glycerate kinase (phosphorylating), D-glycerate 3-kinase, D-glycerate kinase, glycerate-3-kinase, GK, D-glyceric acid kinase, and ATP:D-glycerate 2-phosphotransferase.  This enzyme participates in 3 metabolic pathways: serine/glycine/threonine metabolism, glycerolipid metabolism, and glyoxylate-dicarboxylate metabolism.

This enzyme had been thought to produce 3-phosphoglycerate, but some glycerate kinases produce 2-phosphoglycerate instead.

Structural studies

References

 
 

EC 2.7.1
Enzymes of known structure